This is a list of demons that appear in religion, theology, demonology, mythology, and folklore. It is not a list of names of demons, although some are listed by more than one name.

The list of demons in fiction includes those from literary fiction with theological aspirations, such as Dante's Inferno. Because numerous  concern mythology, folklore, and folk fairy tales, much overlap may be expected.

Key
Each entry names a demon  and gives a source in parentheses.

Sources named 
Demonology: Ayyavazhi, Christian, Hindu, Islamic, Jewish, Thelemite

Eschatology: Christian, Islamic, Jewish eschatology

Folklore: Bulgarian, Christian, German, Jewish, Islamic

Mythology:
Akkadian,
Babylonian,
Buddhist,
Chaldean,
Christian,
Egyptian,
Etruscan,
Finnish,
Greek,
Gnostic,
Guanche,
Hindu,
Hungarian,
Indonesian,
Irish,
Japanese,
Mandaean,
Mapuche,
Moabite,
Native American,
Persian,
Phoenician,
Roman,
Slavic,
Semitic,
Sumerian,
Zoroastrian

Many demons have names with several spellings but few are listed under more than one spelling.

A

 Aamon/Amon (Christian demonology)
 Abaddon/Apollyon (Christian demonology)
 Abezethibou (Jewish demonology)
 Abraxas (Gnosticism)
 Abyzou (Jewish mythology)
 Achlys (Greek mythology)
 Adrammelech (Assyrian mythology, Christian demonology)
 Aeshma (Zoroastrianism)
 Agaliarept (Jewish mythology)
 Agrat bat Mahlat (Jewish demonology)
 Agares (Christian demonology)
 Agiel (Jewish mythology)
 Ahriman/Angra Mainyu (Zoroastrianism)
 Aim/Haborym (Christian demonology)
 Aka Manah/Akem Manah/Akoman/Akvan (Zoroastrianism)
 Akuma (Japanese Buddhism, Japanese Christianity)
 Al Ana (Turkish folklore)
 Ala (Slavic mythology)
 Alal (Chaldean mythology)
 Alastor (Christian demonology)
 Alloces/Allocer (Christian demonology)
 Allu (Akkadian mythology)
 Amaymon (Christian demonology)
 Amdusias (Christian demonology)
 Amy (Christian demonology)
 Anammelech (Assyrian mythology)
 Anathan (Mandaean mythology)
 Anqa (Arabian folklore)
 Ancitif (Christian demonology)
 Andhaka (Hindu mythology)
 Andras (Christian demonology)
 Andrealphus (Christian demonology)
 Andromalius (Christian demonology)
 Anti (Sumerian mythology)
 Antichrist (Christian eschatology)
 Anzu (Sumerian mythology)
 Apaosha (Persian mythology)
 Apep or Apophis (Egyptian mythology)
 Armaros (Jewish demonology)
 Archon (Gnosticism)
 Arunasura (Hindu mythology)
 Asag (Sumerian demonology)
 Asakku (Babylonian mythology)
 Asb'el (Jewish mythology)
 Asmodai/Asmodeus (Jewish folklore, Christian mythology, Islamic folklore)
 Astaroth (Christian demonology)
 Asura (Hindu mythology, Buddhism, Shinto)
 Azazel/Azaz'el (Jewish mythology, Islamic folklore)
 Azi Dahaka/Dahak (Zoroastrianism)

B

 Baal/Bael (Christian demonology)
 Babi ngepet (Indonesian mythology)
 Bakasura (Hindu mythology)
 Baku (Japanese mythology)
 Balam (Christian demonology)
 Balberith (Jewish demonology)
 Bali Raj (Hindu mythology)
 Banshee (Irish mythology)
 Baphomet (Christian folklore, Islamic Folklore, Jewish Mysticism, Satanism, Thelema)
 Barbas (Christian demonology)
 Barbatos (Christian demonology)
 Barong (Indonesian mythology)
 Bathin/Mathim/Bathym/Marthim (Christian demonology)
 Beelzebub (Jewish and Christian demonology)
 Belial (Jewish Christian demonology)
 Beleth (Christian demonology)
 Belphegor (Christian demonology)
 Berith/Beherit (Phoenician mythology, Christian demonology)
 Bhūta (Hindu mythology)
 Bifrons (Christian demonology)
 Boruta (Slavic mythology)
 Botis (Christian demonology)
 Buer (Christian demonology)
 Bukavac (Slavic mythology)
 Bune (Christian demonology)
 Bushyasta (Zoroastrianism)

C
 Caim/Camio (Christian demonology)
 Charun (Etruscan mythology)
 Chemosh (Moabite mythology)
 Choronzon (Thelema)
 Chort (Slavic mythology)
 Cimejes/Kimaris/Cimeies (Christian demonology)
 Corson (Christian demonology)
 Crocell/Procell (Christian demonology)

D

 Daeva (Zoroastrianism)
 Dagon (Semitic mythology)
 Dajjal (Islamic eschatology)
 Dantalion (Christian demonology)
 Danjal (Jewish mythology)
 Decarabia (Christian demonology)
 Demogorgon (Christian demonology)
 Dev (Persian, Islamic demonology)
 Devil (Demonology/Diabology)
 Div-e Sepid (Persian mythology)
 Djall (Albanian mythology)
 Drekavac (Slavic mythology)
 Dzoavits (Native American mythology)

E
 Eblis/Iblis/Ibris (Islamic demonology)
 Eligos (Christian demonology)
 Eisheth (Jewish demonology)
 Erlik (Turkish mythology)

F
 Focalor (Christian demonology)
 Foras/Forcas/Forras (Christian demonology)
 Forneus (Christian demonology)
 Furcas/Forcas (Christian demonology)
 Furfur (Christian demonology)

G
 Gaap (Christian demonology)
 Gader'el (Jewish demonology)
 Gadulta (Mandaean mythology)
 Gaf (Mandaean mythology)
 Gaki (Japanese mythology)
 Gamigin (Christian demonology)
 Ghaddar (Islamic folklore)
 Ghoul (Arabian and world-wide mythologies via adaptation from arabs)
 Giu (Mandaean mythology)
 Glasya-Labolas/Caacrinolaas/Caassimolar/Classyalabolas/Glassia-labolis (Christian demonology)
 Gorgon (Greek mythology)
 Gremory/Gomory (Christian demonology)
 Grigori (Jewish demonology)
 Gualichu (Mapuche mythology)
 Guayota (Guanche mythology)
 Gusion/Gusoin/Gusoyn (Christian demonology)

H
 Haagenti (Christian demonology)
 Hag (Mandaean mythology)
 Halphas/Malthus (Christian demonology)
 Haures/Flauros/Flavros/Hauras/Havres (Christian demonology)
 Hinn (Islamic folklore)
 Hannya (Japanese mythology)

I
 Ifrit (Islamic demonology)
 Incubus (Christian demonology)
 Ipos/Ipes (Christian demonology)

J
 Jinn (Islamic demonology)
 Jikininki (Japanese mythology)

K

 
 Kabandha/Kabhanda (Hindu mythology)
 Kara İye (Turkish mythology)
 Kasadya (Jewish demonology)
 Kokabiel (Jewish mythology)
 Kore (Greek mythology)
 Kroni (Ayyavazhi demonology)
 Krampus (Germanic-Christian demonology)
 Krun (Mandaean mythology)
 Killakee Cat (Hell Fire Club)
 Kukudh (Albanian mythology)
 Kulshedra (Albanian mythology)
 Kumbhakarna (Hindu mythology)

L
 Lamia (Greek mythology)
 Latabi (Mandaean mythology)
 Legion (Christian demonology)
 Lechies (Slavic mythology)
 Leonard (Christian demonology)
 Leyak (Indonesian (Balinese) mythology)
 Lempo (Finnish mythology)
 Leraje/Leraie (Christian demonology)
 Leviathan (according to certain interpretations of Jewish, Gnostic and Christian mythology)
 Lili/Lilin/Lilim (Jewish mythology)
 Lilith (Akkadian mythology, Jewish folklore, Mandaean mythology)
 Ljubi (Albanian mythology)
 Lucifer (Christian theology)
 Lucifuge Rofocale (Christian demonology)

M
 Mag (Mandaean mythology)
 Marid (Islamic demonology)
 Malphas (Christian demonology)
 Mammon (Christian mythology)
 Mara (Buddhist mythology)
 Maricha (Hindu mythology)
 Marax/Morax/Foraii (Christian demonology)
 Marchosias (Christian demonology)
 Mastema (Jewish demonology)
 Mazoku (Japanese folklore)
 Mephistopheles (Christian folklore, German folklore)
 Merihem (Christian demonology)
 Moloch (Jewish, Pagan and Christian mythology, Scientology)
 Murmur (Christian demonology)

N
 Naamah (Jewish mythology)
 Naberius/Cerbere/Naberus (Christian demonology)
 Nalai (Mandaean mythology)
 Ninurta (Sumerian mythology, Akkadian mythology)
 Niuli (Mandaean mythology)
 Namtar (Sumerian mythology)
 Nar as-samum (Islamic folklore)

O
 Oni (Japanese folklore)
 Onoskelis (Jewish mythology)
 Orcus (Roman mythology, later Christian demonology)
 Orias/Oriax (Christian demonology)
 Orobas (Christian demonology)
 Ose (Christian demonology)
 Ördög (Hungarian mythology)
 O Tokata (Indonesian mythology)

P
 Paimon (Christian demonology)
 Pazuzu (Babylonian demonology)
 Pelesit (Indonesian and Malaysian mythology)
 Phenex (Christian demonology)
 Penemue (Jewish and Christian mythology)
 Pithius (Christian demonology)
 Pocong (Indonesian and Malaysia mythology)
 Pontianak (Indonesian and Malaysian mythology)
 Preta (Buddhist demonology)
 Printer's devil (European folklore)
 Pruflas (Christian demonology)
 Puloman (Hindu mythology)

Q
Qin (Mandaean mythology)

R
 Rahab (Jewish folklore)
 Raum (Christian demonology)
 Ronove (Christian demonology)
 Rusalka (Slavic mythology)
 Rakshasa (Hindu mythology)
 Rangda (Indonesian mythology)
 Ruha (Mandaean mythology)

S
 Sabnock (Christian demonology)
 Saleos (Christian demonology)
 Samael (Jewish and Gnostic mythology)
 Salpsan (Christian demonology)
 Satan (Jewish, Christian, Islamic demonology and Mandaean mythology)
 Satanachia (Christian demonology)
 Scylla (Greek mythology)
 Set (Egyptian mythology)
 Seir (Christian demonology)
 Semyaza (Jewish mythology)
 Shax/Chax (Christian demonology)
 Shaitan (Jewish, Islamic demonology)
 Shedim (Jewish folklore)
 Shdum (Mandaean mythology)
 Sitri (Christian demonology)
 Sthenno (Greek mythology)
 Stihi (Albanian mythology)
 Stolas/Solas (Christian demonology)
 Suanggi (Indonesian mythology)
 Succubus (Christian folklore)
 Surgat (Christian demonology)
 Sut (Islamic demonology)
 Shinigami (Japanese mythology)
 Shuten Doji (Japanese mythology)

T
 Tannin (Arabian, Cannanite, Christian, Phoenician, Jewish mythology)
 El Tío (Folk Catholicism)
 Tengu (Shinto)
 Titivillus
 Toyol (Indonesian and Malaysian mythology)
 Tuchulcha (Etruscan mythology)

U
 Ukobach (Christian demonology)
 Ur (Mandaean mythology)

V
 Valac (Christian demonology)
 Valefar/Malaphar/Malephar (Christian demonology)
 Vanth (Etruscan mythology)
 Vapula (Christian demonology)
 Vassago (Christian demonology)
 Vepar (Christian demonology)
 Vine (Christian demonology)

W
 Wechuge (Athabaskan mythology)
 Wendigo (Native American folklore)

X
 Xaphan (Christian demonology)
 Xezbeth (middle-eastern demonology)

Y
Yan-gant-y-tan (French mythology)
Yeqon (Jewish mythology)

Z
 Zabaniyya (Islamic folklore)
 Zagan (Christian demonology)
 Zahreil (Mandaean mythology)
 Zartai-Zartanai (Mandaean mythology)
 Zepar (Christian demonology)
 Ziminiar (Christian demonology)

See also
 Classification of demons
 Demonology
 Fallen angel
 Hell
 List of spiritual entities in Islam
 List of deities
 List of demons in fiction
 List of theological angels

References

 
 

Demons